Southrope is a hamlet in the civil parish of Herriard, Hampshire. It has one pub, named the Fur and Feathers. The hamlet was once considered a part of the civil parish Bentworth, until the late 19th century. The hamlet's toponym derives from Old English Sūþrop, meaning south village.

Governance
The hamlet is part of the civil parish of Herriard and is part of the Upton Grey and the Candovers ward of Basingstoke and Deane borough council. The borough council is a Non-metropolitan district of Hampshire County Council.
At one time, Southrope came under the large parish of Bentworth until its decline in the mid-19th century. Although today, Herriard's parish borders the parish of Bentworth.

References

External links
 Hampshire Treasures Volume 2 (Basingstoke and Deane) Page 131 - Herriard

Villages in Hampshire